Xinyou Coup was a palace coup instigated by Empress Dowagers Cixi and Ci'an, and Prince Gong to seize power after the death of the Xianfeng Emperor. Before he died the previous emperor had appointed group of eight regents, led by Sushun, who were adjutant generals and grand councillors, to assist his infant son Zaichun, later to be known as the Tongzhi Emperor. The eight regents, Zaiyuan, Duanhua, Jingshou, Sushun, Muyin, Kuangyuan, Du Han and Jiao Youying were later forced to commit suicide. Other sources says only three officials were forced to commit suicide.

Background

While most of the royal family fled the Western occupation of Peking in the Second Opium War, Prince Gong remained in the city to deal with the crisis. He would gain respect from the Westerners as a result of his conduct.

By the time of the death of the Xianfeng Emperor, Empress Dowager Cixi had become a shrewd political strategist. In Rehe Province, while waiting for an astrologically favourable time to transport the emperor's coffin back to Beijing, Cixi conspired with court officials and imperial relatives to seize power. Cixi's position as the lower-ranked empress dowager had no intrinsic political power attached to it. In addition, her son, the young emperor, was not a political force himself. As a result, it became necessary for her to ally herself with other powerful figures, including the late emperor's principal wife, Empress Dowager Ci'an. Cixi suggested that they become co-reigning empress dowagers, with powers exceeding the eight regents; the two had long been close friends since Cixi first came to the imperial household.

Tensions grew between the two Empresses Dowager and the eight regents, who were led by Sushun. The regents did not appreciate Cixi's interference in political affairs, and their frequent confrontations with the Empresses Dowager left Empress Dowager Ci'an frustrated. Ci'an often refused to come to court audiences, leaving Cixi to deal with the ministers alone. Secretly, Cixi had begun gathering the support of talented ministers, soldiers, and others who were ostracized by the eight regents for personal or political reasons. Among them was Prince Gong, who had been excluded from power, yet harboured great ambitions, and Prince Chun, the sixth and seventh brothers of the Xianfeng Emperor, respectively. While Cixi aligned herself with the two princes, a memorial came from Shandong asking for her to "listen to politics behind the curtains," i.e., to assume power as de facto ruler. The same memorial also asked Prince Gong to enter the political arena as a principal "aide to the Emperor".

When the Xianfeng Emperor's funeral procession left for Beijing, Cixi took advantage of her alliances with Princes Gong and Chun. She and the boy emperor returned to the capital before the rest of the party, along with Zaiyuan and Duanhua, two of the eight regents, while Sushun was left to accompany the deceased emperor's procession. Cixi's early return to Beijing meant that she had more time to plan with Prince Gong and ensure that the power base of the eight regents was divided between Sushun and his allies, Zaiyuan and Duanhua. In order to remove them from power, history was rewritten: the regents were dismissed for having carried out incompetent negotiations with the "barbarians" that had caused the Xianfeng Emperor to flee to Rehe Province "greatly against his will", among other charges.

To display her high moral standards, Cixi executed only three of the eight regents. Prince Gong had suggested that Sushun and others be executed by the most painful method, known as slow slicing ("death by a thousand cuts"), but Cixi declined the suggestion and ordered that Sushun be beheaded, while the other two also marked for execution, Zaiyuan and Duanhua, were given pieces of white silk for them to hang themselves with. In addition, Cixi refused outright the idea of executing the family members of the regents, as would be done in accordance with imperial tradition of an alleged usurper. Ironically, Qing imperial tradition also dictated that women and princes were never to engage in politics. In breaking with tradition, Cixi became the only empress dowager in the Qing dynasty to rule from "behind the curtains", a practice known as chuí lián tīng zhèng in Chinese.

References

1861 in China
1860s coups d'état and coup attempts
Military coups in China
Forced suicides